Bays Brewery is a microbrewery located in Nelson, New Zealand established in December 1993.

Beers

Media coverage and recognition

References
Tyack, Kerry, New Zealand Beers Auckland: Penguin (2005) 
Stewart, Keith, The Complete Guide to New Zealand Beer Nelson: Craig Potton Pub. (2002)

External links
 Bays Brewery (official website)

1993 establishments in New Zealand
Breweries of New Zealand